Abbayigaru is a 1993 Indian Telugu-language comedy drama film, produced by M. Narasimha Rao under Raasi Movies and directed by E. V. V. Satyanarayana. It stars Venkatesh and Meena, with music composed by M. M. Keeravani. The film recorded as a Super Hit at the box office.

The movie is a remake of the 1987 Tamil movie Enga Chinna Rasa, whose story was inspired by the Kannada novel Ardhaangi by B. Puttaswamayya, which incidentally went on to be adapted into a 1969 Kannada movie Mallammana Pavaada. The film was dubbed in Tamil as Chinna Yejaman.

Plot
Dora Babu is the only child of a multi-millionaire Venkatraidu, who can provide his son with anything he wants, but he loves his mother who ends up dying and his only desire is his mother's love. Venkatraidu cheers him up by remarrying a woman Nagamani, a greedy lady who loves money, thinking that she will care for his son as her natural son. Nagamani and her brother make Venkatraidu paralyzed, consider him as a mental patient and eventually lock him in a room of the family home. Dora Babu becomes devoted to Nagamani, she raises Dora Babu as an uneducated boy since he does anything she says, loves her a lot does whatever she asks of him.

Dora Babu meets Sudha in a marriage and keeps following  her. She is being abducted and assaulted at a fair, he rescues her. The two fall in love and despite the villagers believing she is no longer chaste, he marries her and goes to his mother. Nagamani hates that and separates them with her tactics. Sudha discovers that and her motherly love for Dora Babu is a ruse in an attempt to discredit the sanity of Venkatraidu, and thus is unable to interfere with the plan Nagamani has for the family fortune to be diverted to Dora Babu's step brother Murari, the real son of Nagamani who also shares his mother's greed. A battle of wills between the Nagamani and Sudha ensues.

Nagamani sees that her influence over the family is being challenged by Sudha who insists that Venkatraidu leave his prison and return to the family circle as there is nothing wrong with him. She makes Dora Babu aware of the intentions of his mother. Nagamani starts to abuse and embarrass Sudha with all the family members present. Sudha is ready to leave, but then, to protect her husband and her house from Nagamani's intentions, she decides to apologize to her mother-in-law. Sudha then cleverly starts exposing Nagamani's every effort and intention in a dignified manner so that her husband will not be offended.

Sudha becoming pregnant prompts Nagamani to attempt to kill her and her unborn child with poison. Sudha discovers this and tells her husband. He continues to refuse to believe the treachery although she takes an oath upon her unborn child's life. Dora Babu defends his mother and offers to prove that Sudha is wrong. Dora Babu drinks the milk, He comes to the realization that what Sudha said was all along his mother's intentions. In his usual innocent manner, he asks her why, when all she had to do was simply ask for the wealth—he would have happily agreed to give it all, his words so deeply touched Nagamani that she realises her cruelty has been directed at the only son, who all along had loved her.

Finally, the film concludes with Dora Babu recovering, agreeing to give up to his mother his worldly possessions and leaving home with his wife. At the last moment, Nagamani begs him not to leave, claiming to have learned the error of her ways. She tears up the legal papers and tells him that all she wants is nothing more than Dora Babu.

Cast

 Venkatesh as Dora Babu
 Meena as Sudha
 Srikanth as Murari
 Jayachitra as Naga Mani
 Nutan Prasad as Venkataraidu
 Kota Srinivasa Rao
 Brahmanandam as Obaiah
 Babu Mohan as Bush
 Mallikarjuna Rao 
 AVS as Gumastha 
 P. L. Narayana as Sudha's father
 Sivaji Raja as Sivaji
 Jeeva
 Tirupathi Prakash
 Y. Vijaya
 Chidatala Appa Rao 
 K. K. Sharma 
 Ironleg Shastry  
 "Fight Master" Raju 
 Lathasri 
 Siva Parvathi as Pramila

Soundtrack

Music composed by M. M. Keeravani. Music released on Surya Audio Company.

Other
 VCDs and DVDs on - VOLGA Videos, Hyderabad

The film has crossed the records of Chanti, which is an Industry Hit, at some places.

References

External links

1993 films
1990s Telugu-language films
Indian drama films
Telugu remakes of Tamil films
Films scored by M. M. Keeravani
Films directed by E. V. V. Satyanarayana
1993 drama films